Tver Karelia is the area inside the Tver Oblast that is inhabited by Karelians.

Geography 
By the beginning of the 20th century, the largest number of Tver Karelians lived in Bezhetsky, Vesyegonsky, Vyshnevolotsky, Novotorzhsky, partly in Tversky, Zubtsovsky, Kashinsky uyezds. According to the 1926 census, the Tver Karelians numbered 140,567 people, of which more than 95% spoke the Karelian language.

In 1930, according to the statistical collection of the Moscow Oblast Executive Committee (at that time the eastern part of the former Tver province was part of the Moscow region), Karelians lived in the following districts: 

In total, there were 150,617 Karelians in the region in 1930.

According to the censuses in the Kalinin region, there were these many Karelians:
 1970 - 38,064
 1979 - 30,387
 1989 - 23,169

According to the 2002 census, there were 14,633 Tver Karelians in the Tver oblast.

Karelian villages 
The resettlement of the Karelians to the Tver land was carried out by the Moscow government in an organized manner, the places intended for the settlement of the Karelians were examined in advance, it was indicated how many families could be settled. The Karelians settled mainly in the wastelands (that is, in the place of desolate villages), the original Russian names were usually retained. In the 19th and early 20th centuries, new villages (settlements) and farms appeared.

Karelian villages predominate in the Likhoslavl region, constituting a significant part in the Maksatikhinsky, Rameshkovsky, Spirovsky and Vesyegonsky districts. Now in most of them the population is mixed or Russian.

The town of Likhoslavl emerged on the site of the Karelian villages of Ostashkovo and Likhoslavl.

Population 

Deprived of ties with their fellow tribesmen in Olonets and White Sea Karelia, Tver Karelians eventually separated into a separate subethnos of Karelians, speaking a special Tver dialect of the Karelian language.

History

Karelian National Okrug 

On July 8, 1937, on the territory of the compact settlement of the Tver Karelians, the Karelian National Okrug was created, consisting of three already existing and two newly created districts: Likhoslavl, Novokarelsky, Rameshkovsky, Maksatikhinsky, Kozlovsky. The capital of the district was the city of Likhoslavl. During the first year of the Okrug's existence, many Karelian cultural and educational institutions were created, but on February 25, 1939, it ceased to exist, and many activists of the Karelian movement in the Tver region were repressed.

Tver national-cultural autonomy of Tver Karelians 
In 1997, the Tver national-cultural autonomy of the Tver Karelians was formed, which is a public association of citizens of this nationality on the basis of voluntary self-organization in order to resolve issues of preserving identity, developing their native language, education, and national culture. Includes six regional and one urban cultural autonomy.

References

Bibliography 
 Глинка Ф. Н., О древностях в Тверской Карелии. Извлеч. из писем Ф. Н. Глинки к П. И. Кеппену — 1836.

External links
 Official website of Tver Oblast

 
Ethnic groups in Russia
Ethnic groups in Finland
Indigenous peoples of Europe
Karelia
Karelian people
Regions of Russia